The Khareef class are three corvettes operated by the Royal Navy of Oman. The ships were built by BAE Systems at their shipyard in Portsmouth, as part of a £400m deal it also included training by VT Group.

Role
The three vessels are capable of:
 Protection of maritime areas of interest including EEZ
 Extended surveillance patrols
 Deterrent operations during times of tension
 Fully interoperable with joint and coalition operations
 Special operations
 Search and rescue
 Maritime disaster relief operations

Ships in class

Incidents 

In March 2012 three BAE engineers were injured after a gun misfired during testing off the Dorset coast.

References

External links

 BVT News Release regarding Al Shamikh launch
 Naval Technology
 Khareef class Ocean Patrol Vessel (OPV) - Royal Navy of Oman at navyrecognition.com

Corvettes of the Royal Navy of Oman
Ships built in Southampton
Corvette classes